Parasicydium bandama is a species of goby native to fast-flowing streams and rivers of Cameroon, Congo, Gabon and the Ivory Coast. This species grows to a length of  TL.  This species is the only known member of its genus. The genus refers to this species resemblance to members of the genus Sicydium while the specific name is the name of the Bandama River in the Ivory Coast where the type specimen was collected.

References

Sicydiinae
Monotypic fish genera
Taxa named by Luc M. Risch
Fish described in 1980